Achillea nobilis, the noble yarrow, is a flowering plant in the sunflower family. It is native to Eurasia, widespread across most of Europe (except Scandinavia and the British Isles) and also present in Turkey, the Caucasus, and Central Asia. It is reportedly present in Xinjiang Province in western China, but this is based on a single herbarium specimen collected in the 19th century. The species is widely cultivated and has become naturalized outside of its range in North America and other parts of the world.

Achillea nobilis has creamy-whitish or yellow flowers, and resembles common yarrow (Achillea millefolium) except with more flower heads that are smaller. The leaves of Achillea millefolium are much more finely dissected into needle-like segments. 

The foliage and stems are covered with soft hairs.

References

External links
Tela Botanica, Achillea nobilis L., Achillée noble in French with photos
Plantarium, Русскоязычные названия, Научные: Тысячелистник благородный Систематика Achillea nobilis L. Описание таксона in Russian with photos

nobilis
Flora of temperate Asia
Flora of Europe
Plants described in 1753
Taxa named by Carl Linnaeus